The French Rhythmic Gymnastics Championships ) are an annual rhythmic gymnastics competition, organized by the French Gymnastics Federation.

They usually take place at the same time as the men's and women's national championships in artistic gymnastics.

Winners in the all-around 
 2022: Maelle Millet
 2021: Maelle Millet
 2020: Canceled due to the Covid-19 pandemic
 2019: Célia Joseph-Noël
 2018: Axelle Jovenin
 2017: Kseniya Moustafaeva
 2016: Kseniya Moustafaeva
 2015: Kseniya Moustafaeva
 2014: Kseniya Moustafaeva
 2013: Kseniya Moustafaeva
 2012: Delphine Ledoux
 2011: Delphine Ledoux
 2010: Delphine Ledoux
 2009: Delphine Ledoux
 2008: Delphine Ledoux
 2007: Delphine Ledoux
 2006: Delphine Ledoux
 2005: Delphine Ledoux
 2004: Delphine Ledoux
 2003: Aurélie Lacour
 2002: Aurélie Lacour
 2001: Aurélie Lacour
 2000: Aurélie Lacour
 1999: Amélie Villeneuve
 1998: Eva Serrano
 1997: Eva Serrano
 1996: Eva Serrano
 1995: Eva Serrano
 1994: Eva Serrano
 1993: Eva Serrano
 1992: Chrystelle Sahuc
 1991: Chrystelle Sahuc
 1990: Stéphanie Cottel
 1989: Aurore Retuerto
 1988: Stéphanie Cottel
 1987: Annette Walle - Stéphanie Cottel - Emmanuelle Serre
 1986: Annette Walle
 1985: Annette Walle
 1984: Annette Walle
 1983: Benedicte Augst
 1982: Benedicte Augst
 1981: Martine Vital-Fournier
 1980: Martine Vital
 1979: Catherine Féraud
 1978: Catherine Féraud
 1977: Catherine Féraud
 1976: Catherine Féraud
 1975: Patricia Vanauld
 1974: Josette Pinon-Bellanger
 1973: Patricia Vanauld
 1972: Patricia Vanauld
 1971: Josette Pinon
 1970: Marceline Mouren
 1969: Marceline Mouren
 1968: Anne-Marie Estivin

See also 
 French Gymnastics Championships

References

External links 
 Rhythmic gymnastics on the French Gymnastics Federation official website

Gymnastics competitions in France
French
Gymnastics Rhythmic